Greenmount is a small suburb located in the city of Auckland, in the North Island of New Zealand. The area is on the eastern side of the Auckland city centre and is a large industrial area developed only in recent years. The area is under governance of the Auckland Council, and is home to a number of New Zealand and international businesses and organisations. It is named after the Greenmount or Green Hill volcano.

Suburbs of Auckland